Roy Lee Rogers Jr. (born August 19, 1973) is an American professional basketball coach and former player who is an assistant coach for the Portland Trail Blazers of the National Basketball Association (NBA). He played college basketball for Alabama and was a first-round selection of the Vancouver Grizzlies in the 1996 NBA draft. Rogers played four seasons in the NBA with the Grizzlies, Boston Celtics, Toronto Raptors and Denver Nuggets. He also played in Russia, Italy and Poland.

Rogers started his NBA coaching career as an assistant with the New Jersey Nets in 2008. He has also served as an assistant coach for the Boston Celtics, Detroit Pistons, Washington Wizards, Houston Rockets, Chicago Bulls and Los Angeles Clippers.

College career
Rogers played his college hoops at Alabama under coach David Hobbs.

He tied the NCAA record for blocks in a game with 14 against Georgia on Feb. 10, 1996 and is second all-time in the Crimson Tide basketball record book for career blocked shots with 266.

Rogers was named first team All-SEC for the 1995-1996 season when he averaged 13.5 points per game, 9.3 rebounds per game and 4.9 blocks per game.

Professional career
Rogers, a 6' 9" power forward from the University of Alabama, was selected with the 22nd overall pick in the 1996 NBA Draft by the Vancouver Grizzlies. He was traded to the Boston Celtics one season later for Tony Massenburg and a second-round draft pick. Just before the 1998 All-Star break, he was traded to the Toronto Raptors, with Dee Brown, Chauncey Billups, and John Thomas in a deal that sent Zan Tabak, Kenny Anderson, and Popeye Jones. He was then traded to the Houston Rockets, along with two first round draft picks in exchange for Kevin Willis. He was later sent to the Chicago Bulls, along with a 1999 second-round pick, in a deal for Scottie Pippen, but was waived by them after appearing in one game. He appeared in 137 NBA games between 1996 and 2000, averaging 4.8 points per game. He last played professionally in 2003 in Poland.

Coaching career
Rogers began his coaching career as an assistant with the Huntsville Flight of the NBA Development League in the 2004–05 season. He joined the Tulsa 66ers for the 2005–06 season and then spent the next two seasons with the Austin Toros.

Rogers began his NBA coaching career as an assistant coach for the New Jersey Nets in 2008. On August 3, 2010, he became a scout for the Nets. Shortly after, he left for the Boston Celtics. In 2013, he joined Jason Kidd's coaching staff on the Brooklyn Nets. The next season, he joined the Washington Wizards coaching staff.

On June 1, 2016, Rogers became an assistant coach for the Houston Rockets. On May 24, 2019, Rogers and the Rockets mutually agreed to part ways following a 4–2 loss to the Golden State Warriors for the fourth time in five years. This parting of ways also came after the firing of Jeff Bzdelik, another assistant coach for Houston.

On June 3, 2019, Rogers and the Chicago Bulls agreed to a three-year deal as an assistant coach. On October 12, 2020, the organization announced Rogers would not return to the coaching staff under newly-hired head coach Billy Donovan.

On November 16, 2020, Rogers was hired as an assistant coach for the Los Angeles Clippers under head coach Tyronn Lue.

On August 2, 2021, Rogers was hired as an assistant coach by the Portland Trail Blazers of the National Basketball Association (NBA).

NBA career statistics

Regular season

|-
| style="text-align:left;"|
| style="text-align:left;"|Vancouver
| 82 || 50 || 22.5 || .505 || 1.000 || .574 || 4.7 || .6 || .3 || 2.0 || 6.6
|-
| style="text-align:left;"|
| style="text-align:left;"|Boston
| 9 || 0 || 4.1 || .375 ||  || .500 || .6 || .1 || .2 || .4 || .8
|-
| style="text-align:left;"|
| style="text-align:left;"|Toronto
| 6 || 0 || 11.5 || .353 ||  || .250 || 2.0 || .2 || .2 || .7 || 2.2
|-
| style="text-align:left;"|
| style="text-align:left;"|Denver
| 40 || 0 || 8.9 || .398 || .000 || .463 || 2.0 || .2 || .0 || 1.0 || 2.2
|- class="sortbottom"
| style="text-align:center;" colspan="2"|Career
| 137 || 50 || 16.9 || .483 || .500 || .532 || 3.5 || .4 || .2 || 1.5 || 4.8

See also
 List of NCAA Division I men's basketball players with 13 or more blocks in a game

References

External links

1973 births
Living people
African-American basketball coaches
African-American basketball players
Alabama Crimson Tide men's basketball players
Albuquerque Thunderbirds coaches
American expatriate basketball people in Canada
American expatriate basketball people in Italy
American expatriate basketball people in Poland
American expatriate basketball people in Russia
American men's basketball players
Austin Toros coaches
Basketball coaches from Alabama
Basketball players from Alabama
Boston Celtics assistant coaches
Boston Celtics players
Brooklyn Nets assistant coaches
Chicago Bulls assistant coaches
Denver Nuggets players
Detroit Pistons assistant coaches
Houston Rockets assistant coaches
Huntsville Flight coaches
PBC CSKA Moscow players
People from Linden, Alabama
Portland Trail Blazers assistant coaches
Power forwards (basketball)
Toronto Raptors players
Tulsa 66ers coaches
Vancouver Grizzlies draft picks
Vancouver Grizzlies players
21st-century African-American sportspeople
20th-century African-American sportspeople